Prince George was launched in 1789 on the River Thames as a West Indiaman. She was a transport for the British 1795–1796 expedition to the Caribbean. She later traded between Scotland and Russia, and Scotland and Quebec. She was last listed in 1857, for a nominal service life of 68 years.

Career
Prince George first appeared in Lloyd's Register (LR) in 1789 with John Bailey, master, Fryer & Co., owner, changing to Trecothic & Co., owner, and trade London–Jamaica.

In late 1795 Admiral Hugh Cloberry Christian hoisted his flag aboard the 98-gun  and assembled his squadron and the transports, numbering over two hundred merchantmen carrying 16,000 men, and making up the largest troop convoy to leave England to that date. One of the merchant vessels in the fleet was Prince George, Bailey, master.

The expedition sailed on 6 October, 16 November, and 9 December, but each time weather forced the vessels to put back. The fleet finally successfully sailed on 20 March to invade St Lucia, with troops under Lieutenant-General Sir Ralph Abercromby. St Lucia surrendered to the British on 25 May. The British went on to capture Saint Vincent and Grenada.

In 1806 Rutherford sold Prince George to purchase a new , though the present Prince George still also appeared in the 1806 issue J.Bailey, master, Rutherford, owner, and trade London–Jamaica. The 1807 volume showed the present Prince George with a new master, Pizzie, and owner, Boyman & Co., though still in the London–Jamaica trade.

Prince George disappeared from the 1814 and 1815 volumes of Lloyd's Register and from the 1815 Register of Shipping (RS). She reappeared in subsequent volumes. During this period she may have been serving as a government transport.

Fate
Prince George was last listed in 1857 with information unchanged since 1855.

Citations

1789 ships
Age of Sail merchant ships of England